The Shayba Arena (formerly known as Maly Ice Palace, in Russian: Ледовая Арена Шайба) is a 7,000-seat multi-purpose indoor arena located at Sochi Olympic Park in Adler, southern rayon of Sochi in Russia. "Shayba" is Russian for a hockey puck. The venue was operated by the Russian Ice Hockey Federation and hosted the ice sledge hockey events during the 2014 Winter Paralympics, and some of the ice hockey events during 2014 Winter Olympics along with Bolshoy Ice Dome.

See also
 List of indoor arenas in Russia

References

External links

Small Ice Hockey Arena Information and images
Arena information and drawings
Arena Profile

Indoor arenas in Russia
Indoor ice hockey venues in Russia
Sport in Sochi
Venues of the 2014 Winter Olympics
Olympic ice hockey venues
Adlersky City District
Buildings and structures in Sochi